Angoville is a former commune in the Calvados department in the Normandy region of north-western France. On 1 January 2019, it was merged into the new commune of Cesny-les-Sources.

The inhabitants of the commune are known as Angovillais or Angovillaises

Geography
Angoville is located some 30 km south of Caen and 10 km east by south-east of Thury-Harcourt. The D6 road from Thury-Harcourt to Ussy forms the northern border of the commune. Access to the commune is by the D241 road from Tréprel in the south which passes through the length of the commune and the village and continues north to join the D6 on the border. The commune is mostly farmland with an area of forest in the south which is part of the large Bois de Saint-Claire.

History

Toponymy
Angoville is composed of the old French "ville" (from the Latin "Villae") meaning a rural area or village and a Scandinavian name Asgaut (or Asgautr), gallicized to Asgot, Ansgot, Angot, and Ango - originally the Norman surname Ango and Angot which are widespread in Seine-Maritime.

Administration

List of Successive Mayors of Angoville

Demography
In 2017, the commune had 27 inhabitants.

Economy
The main activities are dairy farming and cropping.

Culture and heritage

Civil heritage
The commune has a number of buildings and structures that are registered as historical monuments:
Houses and Farms (18th-19th century)
A Farmhouse (1786)
The Saint Anne Fountain (1848)
The Town Hall (19th century)
The Motte de Rouvrou Fortified Site (11th century)

Religious heritage

The commune has several religious buildings and structures that are registered as historical monuments:
The Tomb of the Rabâche family (19th century)
The Tomb of Jean-François Rabâche (1816)
The Tomb of Priest François Bouquet (1813)
The Parish Church of Saint-Anne (12th century)

See also
Communes of the Calvados department

References

External links
Angoville on Géoportail, National Geographic Institute (IGN) website 
Angoville on the 1750 Cassini Map

Former communes of Calvados (department)
Populated places disestablished in 2019